Passion is a contemporary worship music band, a central part of Passion Conferences in Atlanta, Georgia.
Passion band have released 28 albums over the span of two decades under the name Passion. Most of the Passion albums are live albums, recorded during performances in conferences or tours. Passion Conferences also owns sixstepsrecords, a record label that includes Crowder and Passion.
Sixstepsrecords artists form the core group of artists performing at the Passion Gatherings, including Chris Tomlin, David Crowder, Charlie Hall, Matt Redman, Christy Nockels, Kristian Stanfill, Melodie Malone, Brett Younker, and Jimi Cravity. Other artists that have performed at Passion Gatherings include Lecrae, Hillsong United, Jesus Culture, Kari Jobe, Tenth Avenue North, Shane and Shane, SonicFlood, Gungor, Rend Collective, and Sean Curran of Bellarive.

History
Passion's first record, Our Soul's Desire, was released in 1997 under Star Song Records. After Star Song artists transferred to Sparrow Records, Passion released two more live albums, including 1999's Better Is One Day, which saw Passion charting on the Billboard Christian Albums chart for the first time. In 2000, Passion Conferences founded sixstepsrecords as a division of Passion Conferences. 
As partners of Sparrow Records, a division of Capitol CMG, sixstepsrecords has many prominent contemporary Christian musicians under their label. Their first album on the newly created label, The Road to One Day, became the first Passion album to chart on the Billboard 200.
Since the creation of sixstepsrecords, Passion has released more than twenty more live albums and two studio albums, nine of which have consecutively charted at No. 1 on the Billboard Christian Albums chart. The lead single off of 2012's live album White Flag, "One Thing Remains", became Passion's first No. 1 song on the Billboard Christian Songs chart. Passion's Let The Future Begin (2013) and Take It All (2014) both peaked at No. 4 on the Billboard 200, making them Passion's highest charting albums.

Discography

Live albums

Studio albums

"—" denotes releases that did not chart.

Compilations and other releases

Singles

Other charted songs

Notes

External links

References 

Sixstepsrecords artists
Musical groups from Atlanta
Musical groups established in 1997
American Christian musical groups
Performers of contemporary worship music
Evangelical Christian music festivals
Recurring events established in 1997
International conferences
Youth conferences
Youth festivals
1997 establishments in Texas